Vallakottai is a 2010 Indian Tamil-language superhero film directed by A. Venkatesh. A remake of the 2007 Malayalam film Mayavi, the film stars Arjun and Haripriya , while Ashish Vidyarthi, Ganja Karuppu, Sathyan, Suresh, Livingston, Vincent Asokan and Prem play supporting roles. The music was composed by Dhina, and the film released on 5 November 2010.

Plot
Vayuputhran aka Muthuvel leaves prison with a promise to his jailmate Bala that he would take care of his ailing brother Sathish, who is about to undergo a surgery. After visiting Sathish in the hospital, Muthu goes to Vallakottai (from where he gets an assignment) to earn money. His job is to surrender for the murder of Eswarapandian, the jameen of Vallakottai, which is to be committed by Eswarapandian's archrivals: Nachiyar and his brother Sethupathi. At Vallakottai, Muthu meets Anjali and Veera Sangili. As scenes unfold, he falls for Anjali and learns that Eswarapandian is harmless and that Nachiyar is the one who is to be punished. Even as acting as a servant of Nachiyar, Muthu wears various outfits in the name of Vayuputhran and teaches a lesson or two to the baddies. In the meantime, Bala is released from prison.He tricks everyone in the village as Vayuputhran and decides to marry Anjali as he could settle down in his life.

Cast

Soundtrack 
The soundtrack was composed by Dhina and features seven tracks, the lyrics of which were written by Thabu Shankar and Karunakaran (Kottuthada Kasu).

 "Semmozhiye Semmozhiye" I - Singer (s): S. P. Balasubrahmanyam, Harini
 "Semmozhiye Semmozhiye" II - Singer(s): S. P. Balasubrahmanyam, S. Janaki (Not featured in the movie)
 "Sarakku Readya" - Singer(s): Karthik, Reeta, Arjun, Sathyan, Dhina
 "Anjile Ondrai" - Singer(s): Shankar Mahadevan, Dhina
 "Magadheera Magadheera" - Singer(s): Tippu, Srimathumitha
 "Kottudhada Kaasu" - Singer(s): Blaaze, Mukesh, Padmalatha, Manikantan, Dev Prakash, Dhina
 "Magadheera" II - Singer(s): Udit Narayan, Saindhavi

Critical reception 
Indiaglitz wrote "To sum it up, Vallakottai starts on a brisk note, loses fizzle as it progresses and ends as damp squib." Behindwoods wrote "Vallakottai takes a plot that has already seen huge success and tries to recreate the same magic. But perhaps director A Venkathesh should have taken into account varied regional tastes and the vast difference in styles between the lead performers and appropriately tweaked the script. Nevertheless, Vallakottai is not a total let down; it does have its moments, the portions of action, the instances of laughter and a central plot that is not altogether predictable. But, more care in adaptation to the regional milieu could have made it much more entertaining."

References

External links 
 

2010 films
Indian action films
2010 action films
Tamil remakes of Malayalam films
2010s Tamil-language films
Films directed by A. Venkatesh (director)